The Japan Meteorological Agency (JMA) Seismic Intensity Scale (known in Japan as the Shindo seismic scale) is a seismic intensity scale used in Japan to categorize the intensity of local ground shaking caused by earthquakes.

The JMA intensity scale should not be confused or conflated with magnitude measurements like the moment magnitude (Mw) and the earlier Richter scales, which represent how much energy an earthquake releases. Much like the Mercalli scale, the JMA scheme quantifies how much ground-surface shaking takes place at measurement sites distributed throughout an affected area. Intensities are expressed as numerical values called ; the higher the value, the more intense the shaking. Values are derived from peak ground acceleration and duration of the shaking, which are themselves influenced by factors such as distance to and depth of the hypocenter (focus), local soil conditions, and nature of the geology in between, as well as the event's magnitude; every quake thus entails numerous intensities.

The data needed for calculating intensity are obtained from a network of 670 observation stations using "Model 95" strong ground motion accelerometers. The agency provides the public with real-time reports through the media and Internet giving event time, epicenter (location), magnitude, and depth followed by intensity readings at affected localities.

History 
In 1898 the scale was changed to a numerical scheme, assigning earthquakes levels 0–7.

In 1908, descriptive parameters were defined for each level on the scale, and the intensities at particular locales accompanying an earthquake were assigned a level according to perceived effect on people at each observation site. This was widely used during the Meiji period and revised during the Shōwa period with the descriptions seeing an overhaul.

Following the Great Hanshin Earthquake of 1995, the first quake to generate shaking of the scale's strongest intensity (7), intensities 5 and 6 were each redefined into two new levels, reconfiguring the scale into one of 10 increments: 0–4, 5-lower (5–), 5-upper (5+), 6-lower (6–), 6-upper (6+), and 7. This scale has been in use since 1996.

Scale overview
The JMA scale is expressed in levels of seismic intensity from 0 to 7 in a manner similar to that of the Mercalli intensity scale, which is not commonly used in Japan. Real-time earthquake reports are calculated automatically from seismic-intensity-meter measurements of peak ground acceleration throughout an affected area, and the JMA reports the intensities for a given quake according to the ground acceleration at measurement points. Since there is no simple, linear correlation between ground acceleration and intensity (it also depends on the duration of shaking), the ground-acceleration values in the following table are approximations.

Intensity 7 
The Intensity 7 (震度7) is the maximum intensity in the Japan Meteorological Agency seismic intensity scale, covering earthquakes with an instrumental intensity (計測震度) of 6.5 and up. The effects of Intensity 7 earthquakes include generally throwing people off by the shaking and making it impossible to move at will. The intensity was made in the wake of the 1948 Fukui earthquake. The 1995 Great Hanshin earthquake was the first earthquake to observe a seismic intensity 7. Below is a list of earthquakes with Intensity 7.

Comparison with other seismic scales

A 1971 study that collected and compared intensities according to the JMA and the Medvedev–Sponheuer–Karnik (MSK) scales showed that the JMA scale was more suited to smaller earthquakes whereas the MSK scale was more suited to larger earthquakes. The research also suggested that for small earthquakes up to JMA intensity 3, a correlation between the MSK and JMA values could be calculated with the formula MSK = JMA1.5 + 1.5, whereas for larger earthquakes the correlation was MSK = JMA1.5 + 0.75.

See also 
 Earthquake engineering
 Japanese Coordinating Committee for Earthquake Prediction
 List of earthquakes in Japan
 Nuclear power in Japan (seismicity section)
 Seismic intensity scales
 Seismic magnitude scales

References

External links 
Recent earthquakes in Japan listed by time of occurrence with localities, magnitude, and maximum intensity. Click on the time of occurrence to see a map showing affected areas; click an affected area on the map to see a more localized shake map showing distribution of intensities (in English).
The JMA Seismic Intensity Scale with detailed descriptions (in English).

1884 establishments in Japan
Seismic intensity scales
Seismic Intensity Scale
Science and technology in Japan